The Ge or Gejia language, also known as Zhong'anjiang Miao, is a Western Miao language of Huangping County, Guizhou, China. The endonym is spelled Mhong, though it shares this with Huishui Miao; it is pronounced , as in the Hmong language. When speaking Chinese, they call themselves .

Gejia is spoken in eastern Guizhou, in speech islands within the area of the Hmu language, which includes the standard dialect.

Dongjia
The Dongjia (东家) language of Majiang County, Guizhou is closely related to Gejia. The Dongjia people are officially classified as She, but speak a West Hmongic language. Their autonym is Gameng (嘎孟), while the neighboring Raojia people call them Gadou (嘎斗). The Dongjia people of Liubao (六堡村), Xingshan Township (杏山镇), Majiang County was studied by Dong Bo (2008). Chen Xueyu (2011) considers Gejia and Dongjia to form two dialects of Chong'anjiang Miao, which belongs to the Chuanqiandian branch.

References

Works cited

  http://www.docin.com/p-467133563.html

External links
 Changanjiang Miao numerals

West Hmongic languages
Languages of China